Thomas Tinsley Rogers (August 26, 1910 – June 16, 1990) was an American football player and coach of football and baseball.  He served as the head football coach at Wake Forest University from 1951 to 1955, compiling a record of 21–25–4.  He was also the head baseball coach at Clemson University from 1941 to 1942, tallying a mark of 18–14.

Born in 1910 and a native of Hinton, West Virginia, Rogers played college football as an end at Duke University under Wallace Wade from 1931 to 1933.  He served as an assistant football coach at Wake Forest from 1938 to 1940 and at Clemson University in 1941 and 1942.  After serving in the United States Navy during World War II, Rogers returned to Wake Forest as an assistant coach in 1946.  He succeeded Peahead Walker as head coach there in 1951.  He resigned from his post at Wake Forest in February 1956 to go into real estate development near Southport, North Carolina.  Tinsley died at his home, in Durham, North Carolina, on June 16, 1990.

Head coaching record

References

External links
 

1910 births
1990 deaths
American football ends
Clemson Tigers baseball coaches
Clemson Tigers football coaches
Duke Blue Devils football coaches
Duke Blue Devils football players
Wake Forest Demon Deacons football coaches
People from Hinton, West Virginia
People from Southport, North Carolina
Baseball coaches from West Virginia
Coaches of American football from West Virginia
Players of American football from West Virginia
United States Navy personnel of World War II